Murray Fletcher Pratt (25 April 1897 – 10 June 1956) was an American writer of history, science fiction, and fantasy. He is best known for his works on naval history and the American Civil War and for fiction written with L. Sprague de Camp.

Life and work 

According to de Camp, Pratt was born near Tonawanda, New York. The son of Robert M. and Alice Horton Pratt, he attended public schools in Buffalo and graduated from high school in 1915 at the Griffith Institute in Springville, New York, where his father operated a trucking delivery service between Springville and Buffalo.

Following high school he attended Hobart College in Geneva, New York, for one year. In February 1916 the Associated Press reported that he had been arrested for burglary in Geneva after a series of midnight cash drawer robberies that allegedly netted him less than $25. He was reported to have told police that his father did not supply him with enough funds to survive at Hobart. On February 23 the Buffalo Enquirer reported: "Pratt's father came on from Springville yesterday and it was practically decided to send the youth to the State Hospital for the Insane at Willard, pending an investigation of his case by the grand jury. It is thought that he may be mentally unsound."

In May 1918 the Washington Star reported that the staff at the camp library at the Army's Camp Meade in Maryland had been strengthened by the addition of "Murray F. Pratt, who recently came here from the Buffalo, N.Y., Public Library".

After a stint at the Buffalo Courier-Express he settled in New York City in 1920 and worked for a Staten Island newspaper before turning to freelance writing in 1923. In 1926, he married Inga Stephens, an artist. According to de Camp she was his second wife. In the late 1920s he began selling stories to pulp magazines, primarily the science fiction magazines published by Hugo Gernsback. Many of these stories were either written with a collaborator or were translations from French and German sources. 

When a fire gutted his apartment in the early 1930s, according to de Camp's memoir, he used the insurance money to study at the Sorbonne for a year. After his return from France he was a staff writer for American Detective, a true crime magazine, and  began writing histories. His short history of the Civil War, Ordeal by Fire, was published to critical acclaim in 1935 and became a bestseller.

Starting in the summer of 1937 Pratt became a regular at the annual Bread Loaf Writers' Conference in Vermont for the next 18 years, eventually becoming their Dean of Nonfiction. 

During World War II Pratt was a military analyst for the New York Post and for Time magazine (whose obituary described him as "bearded, gnome-like" and listed "raising marmosets" among his hobbies), and later was a regular reviewer of historical nonfiction and fantasy and science fiction for the New York Times Book Review.

Following World War II the Pratts came into possession of a rambling 31-room Victorian mansion on a high bluff  overlooking the Atlantic Ocean at Atlantic Highlands, New Jersey, purchased by Inga Stephens Pratt's wealthy mother for use as a summer place. Whimsically dubbed The Ipsy-Wipsy Institute, the house became a watering hole for Fletcher's literary friends at an unending succession of marathon weekend house parties. A number of writers moved into the mansion's many bedrooms and spent entire summers there. Frequent guests and residents at Ipsy-Wipsy included William Lindsay Gresham, John Ciardi, William Sloane, Basil Davenport, Lester del Rey, Ted Sturgeon, Esther Carlson, Fred Pohl, John D. 
Clark, Willy Ley, Judith Merrill, Eugenie Clark, L. Sprague de Camp, and many others. Laurence Manning, Pratt's old writing partner from the 1930s, purchased part of the property and moved in next door. The Pratts simultaneously maintained a large apartment in Midtown Manhattan near Central Park, where they hosted meetings of the Hydra Club.

Pratt was the inventor of a set of rules for naval wargaming, which he created before the Second World War. This was known as the "Fletcher Pratt Naval War Game" and it involved dozens of tiny wooden ships, built on a scale of one inch to 50 feet. These were spread over the floor of Pratt's apartment and their strengths were calculated via a complex mathematical formula. Noted author and artist Jack Coggins was a frequent participant in Pratt's Navy Game, and de Camp met him through his wargaming group.

Pratt established the literary dining club known as the Trap Door Spiders in 1944. The name is a reference to the exclusive habits of the trapdoor spider, which when it enters its burrow pulls the hatch shut behind it. The club was later fictionalized as the Black Widowers in a series of mystery stories by Isaac Asimov. Pratt himself was fictionalized in one story, "To the Barest", as the Widowers’ founder, Ralph Ottur.

He was also a charter member of The Civil War Round Table of New York, organized in 1951, and served as its president from 1953 to 1954. In 1956, after his death, the Round Table's board of directors established the Fletcher Pratt Award in his honor, which is presented every May to the author or editor of the best non-fiction book on the Civil War published during the preceding calendar year.

Aside from his historical writings, Pratt is best known for his fantasy collaborations with de Camp, the most famous of which is the humorous Harold Shea series, eventually published in full as The Complete Compleat Enchanter (1989). His solo fantasy novels The Well of the Unicorn and The Blue Star are also highly regarded. Pratt's story "Dr. Grimshaw's Sanitarium" was adapted for radio drama by George Lefferts, and broadcast twice: first on Dimension X (September 22, 1950) and then on X Minus One (July 14, 1955). 

Pratt wrote in a markedly identifiable prose style, reminiscent of the style of Bernard DeVoto. One of his books is dedicated "To Benny DeVoto, who taught me to write."

Several of Pratt's books were illustrated by Inga Stephens Pratt, his wife.

Bibliography

Novels 
 Land of Unreason (1941) with L. Sprague de Camp
 The Carnelian Cube (1948) with L. Sprague de Camp
 The Well of the Unicorn (1948)
 The Blue Star (1952)
 Double Jeopardy (1952)
 The Undying Fire (1953)
 Invaders from Rigel (1960)
 Alien Planet (1962)

Novellas (short novels)
 "Asylum Satellite" (1951)
 "The Wanderer's Return" (1951)

Series

Harold Shea 
 The Mathematics of Magic: The Enchanter Stories of L. Sprague de Camp and Fletcher Pratt (2007) with L. Sprague de Camp
 The Complete Compleat Enchanter (1989) with L. Sprague de Camp
 The Compleat Enchanter (1975) with L. Sprague de Camp
 * The Incomplete Enchanter (1940) with L. Sprague de Camp
 * The Castle of Iron (1941) with L. Sprague de Camp
 Wall of Serpents [vt The Enchanter Completed (1980 UK)] (1960) with L. Sprague de Camp

Collections 

 Double in Space (1951)
 Double Jeopardy (1952)
 Tales from Gavagan's Bar (1953, expanded 1978) with L. Sprague de Camp

Anthologies 
 World of Wonder (1951)

Twayne Triplets (edited) 
 The Petrified Planet (1952)
 Witches Three (1952)

Nonfiction 
 Fletcher Pratt's Naval War Game (1940). A book on the Fletcher Pratt Naval Wargame was printed in 2011. See link
 A Man and His Meals (1947)
 World of Wonder : an Introduction to Imaginative Literature (1951)

Science 
 All About Famous Inventors and Their Inventions (1955) illustrated by Rus Anderson
 All About Rockets and Jets (1955) illustrated by Jack Coggins
 Rockets, Jets, Guided Missiles and Spaceships (1951) with Jack Coggins
 By Space Ship to the Moon (1952) with Jack Coggins
 Rockets, Satellites and Space Travel (1958) with Jack Coggins

History and Biography

Naval History 
 The Compact History of the United States Navy (1957) 
 Empire and the Sea (1946) with Inga Stephens
 Fighting Ships of the U.S. Navy (1941) illustrated by Jack Coggins
 Fleet Against Japan (1946)
 The Navy has Wings; the United States Naval Aviation (1943)
 The Navy, a History; the Story of a Service in Action (1938)
 The Navy's War (1944)
 Night Work: the Story of Task force 39 (1946) 
 Preble's Boys; Commodore Preble and the Birth of American Sea Power (1950) 
 Sea Power and Today's War (1939) 
 Ships, Men - and Bases (1941) with Frank Knox
 A Short History of the Army and Navy (1944)

The Napoleonic Wars 
 The Empire and the Glory; Napoleon Bonaparte: 1800-1806 (1948)
 Road to Empire; the Life and Times of Bonaparte, the General (1939)

War of 1812
 The Heroic Years; Fourteen Years of the Republic, 1801-1815 (1934)

The Civil War 
 Ordeal by Fire; an Informal History of the Civil War (1935)
 The Monitor and the Merrimac (1951)
 The Military Genius of Abraham Lincoln : an Essay (1951) by Colin R. Ballard; introduction by Pratt
 Stanton, Lincoln's Secretary of War (1953)
 The Civil War (1955)
 Civil War in Pictures (1955)
 Civil War on Western Waters (1956)

World War II 
 America and Total War (1941)
 The U.S. Army : a Guide to its Men and Equipment (1942) with David Pattee
 What the Citizen Should Know about Modern War (1942)
 The Marines' War, an Account of the Struggle for the Pacific from Both American and Japanese Sources (1948)
 War for the World; a Chronicle of Our Fighting Forces in World War II (1950)

Other 

 The Cunning Mulatto and Other Cases of Ellis Parker, American Detective (1935) with Ellis Parker
 Hail, Caesar! (1936)
 The Lost Battalion (1938) with Thomas M. Johnson
 Muscle-power Artillery (1938)
 "The City of the Living Dead" (1939) with Laurence Manning.
 Secret and Urgent; the Story of Codes and Ciphers (1939) 
 My Life to the Destroyers (1944) with L. A. Abercrombie
 Eleven Generals; Studies in American Command (1949)
 The Third King (1950)
 The Battles that Changed History (1956)

Wargame Rules 
The rules of Pratt's wargame, official variants, and a number of stories about participants and events in his wargame club have been published in "Fletcher Pratt's Naval Wargame: Wargaming with model ships 1900 - 1945" by John Curry, ISBN 978-1-4475-1855-6, published by Naval Wargaming Books.

References

External links 
 
 
 
 
 FantasticFiction — Bibliography and book covers
 
 Fletcher Pratt Naval & Military Historian at Endless Bookshelf.Net

1897 births
1956 deaths
20th-century American male writers
20th-century American non-fiction writers
20th-century American novelists
American fantasy writers
American male non-fiction writers
American male novelists
American military writers
American science fiction writers
Board game designers
Novelists from New York (state)
Writers from Buffalo, New York